Fort Frederick is a historic military building located on Point Frederick on the grounds of the Royal Military College of Canada (RMC) in Kingston, Ontario, Canada. Its construction dates to 1846 and the Oregon boundary dispute. The fort consists of earthworks surrounding a Martello tower.  Fort Frederick  is included in two separate National Historic Sites of Canada: Kingston Fortifications National Historic Site and the Point Frederick Buildings National Historic Site.

History
Fort Frederick was built on the south end of Point Frederick, the site of the Kingston Royal Naval Dockyard. The point and fort were named after Frederick, Prince of Wales.  The original fort, consisting of earthworks, was built during the War of 1812 for protection against naval attack. On November 10, 1812, the Fort Frederick battery took part in repulsing an American naval squadron under Commodore Isaac Chauncey.

Four stone Martello towers were built to strengthen Kingston's defences in 1846 during the Oregon boundary dispute between the United States and Britain. The towers were meant to protect the shipyard and the entrances to the Rideau Canal and St. Lawrence River, from possible United States aggression. Fort Frederick was one of these towers, built on the site of the original fort. The three other towers were Cathcart Tower, Murney Tower, and Shoal Tower. Fort Frederick was abandoned in 1870. Fort Frederick is the RMC cadets' outdoor relaxed area, where all cadets are considered equal in rank, headdress may be removed, and cadets have free rein to relax. The Martello tower houses the RMC Museum.

Alexander Mackenzie was a foreman on the construction of the Fort Frederick Martello Tower and later went on to become Canada's second prime minister.
While on an unannounced trip to Fort Frederick to look for a possible site for a new military college, Prime Minister Mackenzie asked the then commandant, Colonel de la C.T. Irwin, if he knew the thickness of the outside wall.  When the surprised commandant could not answer, Prime Minister Mackenzie said "It's 5 feet 6 inches, I know for I built it myself!".

While Archibald Macdonnell was Commandant of RMC, between 1909 and 1919, the upper floors of Fort Frederick were used as a common room. After the seniors rolled cannonballs down the common room stairs, the floor was reallocated as a recruit haven. The college's class of 1931 gifted Fort Frederick with wooden gates and a plaque in 1971 in remembrance of the days when Fort Frederick was a recruit refuge.

Legacy
On 28 June 1985 Canada Post issued 'Fort Frederick, Ont.' one of the 20 stamps in the "Forts Across Canada Series" (1983 and 1985). The stamps are perforated 12 x 13 and were printed by Ashton-Potter Limited based on the designs by Rolf P. Harder.

Affiliations
The Museum is affiliated with: CMA,  CHIN, and Virtual Museum of Canada.

See also

 List of forts
 List of National Historic Sites of Canada in Kingston, Ontario
 Royal eponyms in Canada

References

Further reading
 
 Mika, Nick and Helma et al. Kingston, Historic City. Belleville: Mika Publishing Co., 1987. .
 RMC Review, 1946 "The Honourable Alexander Mackenzie in Relation to Kingston and RMC" W.R.P.B.
 Royal Military College of Canada, Fort Frederick: Facts brochure, (Kingston, 2000).
 Royal Military College of Canada, Visit Fort Frederick and the Royal Military College of Canada Museum brochure, (Kingston, 2000).

External links

 Ontario Heritage Plaque - Point Frederick Peninsula Point Frederick buildings
 Kingston Fortifications National Historic Site Management Plan (Ottawa: Parks Canada, 2006)

Infrastructure completed in 1812
Infrastructure completed in 1846
Buildings and structures in Kingston, Ontario
Frederick
Royal Military College of Canada
National Historic Sites in Ontario
Frederick